L17 or L-17 may refer to:

Vehicles 
 , a support ship of the Royal Danish Navy 
 , a submarine of the Royal Navy
 , a tank landing ship of the Indian Navy
 Lichi L17, a Chinese microcar
 Ryan L-17 Navion, an American light aircraft
 , a Leninets-class submarine
 L-17, a United States Navy L-class blimp

Proteins 
 60S ribosomal protein L17
 L17 ribosomal protein leader
 Mitochondrial ribosomal protein L17

Other uses 
 Lectionary 17, a Greek manuscript of the New Testament, dating between the 9th and the 12th century
 Taft Airport, in Kern County, California

Ship disambiguation pages